Elections to Hyndburn Borough Council were held on 4 May 2006. One third of the council was up for election and the Conservative party stayed in overall control of the council. Two seats had been lost to Labour in by elections in 2005 (Rishton and Overton) but both these were won back at this election. However the Conservatives did lose one seat to Labour, Immanuel Ward reducing their majority to 19. (18+2-1=19)

After the election, the composition of the council was
Conservative 19
Labour 15
Independent 1

Election result

Ward results

Susan Shorrocks had won the seat for Labour from the Conservatives 30 June 2005 after the resignation of Wyn Frankland. The Tories won it back at this election.

Claire Hamilton had won the seat for Labour from the Conservatives 17 March 2005 following the death of June Butler. The Tories won it back at this election.

References
2006 Hyndburn election result
Tories keep control of Hyndburn
Ward results

2006 English local elections
2006
2000s in Lancashire